Assistant Police Chief Will Pope is a fictional character featured in TNT's The Closer, portrayed by J. K. Simmons. Pope is the Assistant Chief for Operations of the Los Angeles Police Department (LAPD). Pope, along with Commander Taylor, is one of two characters on the show who has a real-life equivalent, in this case Assistant Chief Earl Paysinger, Director and Commanding Officer of Office of Operations, Los Angeles Police Department.

Despite bringing Brenda Leigh Johnson in for the job, he doesn't seem to want to let her actually do her work. He had an extramarital affair with Johnson when they worked together in Washington, D.C. After he ended it, he divorced his first wife to marry a woman named Estelle, who eventually divorced him. This history causes some personal tension between the two of them.

In season six, Pope expects to be on the short list to become the new Chief of Police but discovers he is not being considered. When Tommy Delk is named Chief, Pope is assigned to the traffic division and considers quitting the force. When Delk suddenly dies, Pope is named Interim Chief, to the surprise of many.

Pope seems to still harbor feelings for Johnson, and he acts jealous of her relationship with Fritz Howard. 

By the beginning of Major Crimes, Pope has become the Chief of Police on a permanent basis. He promotes Russell Taylor to his old position of Assistant Chief. Though both men promised to promote Sharon Raydor to the rank of Commander if she took over Major Crimes, this is revealed to have been a lie and that the new position itself is her promotion. In Major Crimes, Pope is not seen and is rarely mentioned with Assistant Chief Taylor acting as the supervisor of the Major Crimes Division. Pope also makes it clear to Provenza through Taylor that Provenza's choices are to either retire or deal with Sharon as Pope refuses to transfer him.

In season 5 of Major Crimes, Taylor is murdered in a courtroom shootout, leaving Pope to find a new Assistant Chief. A competition develops between Deputy Chief Winnie Davis, Commander Leo Mason and Captain Sharon Raydor for the position. After Davis' behavior nearly screws up a case in "Shockwave, Part 1," Pope is stated in "Shockwave, Part 2" to have sent her to a leadership conference and replaced her liaison role in the case with Fritz Howard. At the end of "Shockwave, Part 2," Pope promotes Leo Mason to the role of Assistant Chief and Mason promotes Sharon Raydor to the rank of Commander, the promotion that she had long ago been promised by Pope and Taylor but denied.

Personality
Pope commands the authority of his team, and the department detectives generally respect him. Closing cases and convicting criminals is his first priority, even if it means he has to take the heat from his superiors. However, he's not above throwing others under the bus when necessary. 

Pope can be something of a chameleon, often playing both sides of the fence to get what he wants. Unlike Brenda, he plays along with law enforcement politics in order to advance his own career. 

Although he can be overly controlling, he has a soft spot for Brenda and is always eager to please her. When she first transfers to the LAPD, for example, Pope readily defends her against the other detectives' complaints, and he is often fiercely protective of her.

References

Fictional Los Angeles Police Department officers
The Closer characters
Television characters introduced in 2005